Estrella López Sheriff (born 1 December 1992) is a Spanish judoka.

She is the bronze medallist of the 2020 European Judo Championships in the -52 kg category.

References

External links
 
 

1992 births
Living people
Spanish female judoka
20th-century Spanish women
21st-century Spanish women